Miguel Pontes Timóteo Lutonda, 186 cm/´6'1", 78 kg/72 lbs, (born December 24, 1971) is a retired Angolan professional basketball point guard.

For two consecutive years: 2001 and 2002, he received the Angola Sportsman of the Year Award.

He is a two-time FIBA Africa Championship MVP, having won such title in 2001 and 2003. He was also voted MVP at the 2003 Angolan league.

On October 17, 2012, Lutonda played his last official match for Primeiro de Agosto, in a game against Recreativo do Libolo for the Victorino Cunha Cup. At the end of the game, his 14 jersey was retired by Primeiro de Agosto.

Career as a Player
Lutonda represented Angola at the 2000 and 2004 Summer Olympics with the Angola national basketball team. He also competed with Angola at the 2002 and 2006 FIBA World Championships.

Coaching career
In June 2013, Lutonda has been appointed assistant coach of Angola's U-16 national basketball team. In July 2013, Lutonda won his first gold medal (as assistant coach) as Angola beat Egypt 75-66 in the final.

Achievements

Titles Won

Sources
 Miguel Lutonda at basket-stats.info
 Angola at the 2000 Olympic Games

External links
 

1971 births
Living people
Angolan men's basketball players
Atlético Sport Aviação basketball players
Basketball players at the 2000 Summer Olympics
Basketball players at the 2004 Summer Olympics
C.D. Primeiro de Agosto men's basketball players
Olympic basketball players of Angola
Point guards
Basketball players from Luanda
2010 FIBA World Championship players
2006 FIBA World Championship players
2002 FIBA World Championship players